List of public and private primary schools in Humboldt County, California.

Private schools
 Saint Bernard's Catholic School (Preschool-12) (Eureka)
 Humboldt Bay Christian School (1-8) (Bayside, California|Bayside)
 Fortuna Junior Academy (K-8) (Fortuna)
 Redwood Christian School (K-8) (Eureka)
 Mistwood Educational Center (K-12) (Bayside)

Charter schools
 Alder Grove Charter School - I.S. (K-12)
 American Indian Academy (McKinleyville)
 Beginnings (K-8) - I.S. (Briceland)
 Blue Heron Middle School (4-8) - I.S. (Arcata)
 Campus House - I.S. (Arcata)
 Cutten Resource Center (Eureka)
 Coastal Grove Charter School (K-8) (Arcata)
 Dunes of Discovery (K-8) - I.S. (Arcata)
 Freshwater Charter Middle School (7-8)
 Fuente Nueva (K-5)(Arcata)
 Jacoby Creek Charter School (K-8) (Bayside)
 Laurel Tree Learning Center (K-12) (Arcata)
 Mattole Valley Charter School (K-12) (Honeydew)
 Laurel Tree (K-12) - I.S. (Arcata)
 North Coast Learning (K-12) - I.S. (Eureka)
 North Coast High School - I.S. Eureka
 Northcoast  Charter - Main Campus (K-8) (Arcata/Trinidad)
 Northcoast Preparatory and Performing Arts Academy (Arcata)
 Pacific View Charter School (3-12)
 Redway Site - I.S.
 River Valley School (K-8) - I.S. (Fortuna)
 Six Rivers Charter High School (9-12) (Arcata)
 South Bay Charter (7-8) (Eureka)
 South Bay Charter Independent Studies (Tk-8) Eureka 
 Trillium Charter School (K-5) (Arcata)

Humboldt County Public School Districts and Schools

Arcata School District
 Arcata Elementary Preschool ages 2–5
 Arcata Elementary School K-5
 SunnyBrae Middle School 6-8
 Arcata High School 9-12
 Pacific Union Elementary School K-8

Big Lagoon Union Elementary School District
 Big Lagoon School K-8

Blue Lake Union Elementary School District
 Blue Lake School K-8
 Green Point School K-7

Bridgeville Elementary School District
 Bridgeville School K-8

Cuddeback Union School District
 Cuddeback School K-8

Cutten Elementary School District
 Ridgewood School K-2
 Cutten School  3-6

Eureka City Schools District
 Alice Birney School K-5 
 Eureka Adult School 
 Eureka High School 9-12 
 Grant School K-5 
 Humboldt Bay High School 
 Lafayette School K-5 
 Lincoln School K-5 
 Washington School K-5 
 Winship Middle School 6-8 
 Winzler Children’s Center 
 Zane Middle School 7-8  
 Zoe Barnum High School

Ferndale Unified School District
 Ferndale Elementary School K-8
 Ferndale High School

Fieldbrook Elementary School District
 Fieldbrook School K-8

Fortuna Union School District

Fortuna Elementary School District
 Fortuna Middle School 5-8
 South Fortuna Elementary School K-4

Fortuna Union High School District
 Academy of the Redwoods 
 East High Fortuna
 Fortuna Union High School 9-12

Rohnerville Elementary School District
 Ambrosini School K-4
 Toddy Thomas School 5-8

Freshwater Elementary School District
 Freshwater School K-6
 Freshwater Charter Middle School 7,8

Garfield Elementary School District
 Garfield School K-6

Humboldt County Office of Education
 Glen Paul Center
 Pacific Coast High School 
 Mattole Valley Charter School 
 Terra Madre Alternative School
  Northcoast Preparatory Academy

Hydesville Elementary School District
 Hydesville School K-8
 Jacoby Creek Charter School District
 Jacoby Creek Charter School K-8

Klamath-Trinity Joint Unified School District
 Capt. John Continuation High School Alt.
 Hoopa Valley Elementary School K-8 
 Hoopa Valley High School 9-12 
 Jack Norton Elementary School K-8 
 Orleans Elementary School K-8 (Trinity County)
 Trinity Valley Elementary School K-8
 Weitchpec Elementary School K-8

Kneeland Elementary School District
 Kneeland School K-8

Loleta Union School District
 Loleta Elementary School K-8

Maple Creek Elementary School District
 Maple Creek School K-8

Mattole Unified School District
 Honeydew Elementary School K-6
 Mattole Elementary School K-8
 Mattole Triple Junction High School 9-12

McKinleyville Union School District
 Dow’s Prairie School K-5
 McKinleyville Middle 6-8
 Morris Elementary K-5
 McKinleyville High School 9-12

Northern Humboldt Union High School District
 Arcata High School 9-12
 McKinleyville High School 9-12
 Northern Humboldt Adult School Adult
 Pacific Coast High School Alt.
 Tsurai High School Alt.

Orick Elementary School District
 Orick School K-8

Pacific Union School District
 Pacific Union School K-8

Peninsula Union School District
 Peninsula School K-8

Rio Dell School District
 Monument Middle School 4-8
 Eagle Prairie Elementary School K-3

Scotia Union School District
 Scotia School K-8

South Bay Union School District
 Pine Hill School K-3
 South Bay School 4-6
 South Bay Middle School 7-8
 South Bay Independent Studies TK-8

Southern Humboldt Unified School District
 Agnes J. Johnson School (K-6) (also known as Weott Elementary)
 Casterlin Elementary School (K-8)
 Ettersburg School (K-3)
 Redway School (K-7)
 South Fork High School (Miranda, California) (8-12)
 Osprey Learning Center (6-12)
 Whitethorn School (K-5)

Trinidad School District
 Trinidad Elementary School (K-8)

References

External links
Eureka City Schools
Humboldt County Office of Education
Mistwood Educational Center

Humboldt County